A cooking show, cookery show, or cooking program (also spelled cooking programme in British English) is a television genre that presents food preparation, often in a restaurant kitchen or on a studio set, or at the host's personal home.  Typically the show's host, often a celebrity chef, prepares one or more dishes over the course of an episode, taking the viewing audience through the food's inspiration, preparation, and stages of cooking.

Cooking shows have been a popular staple of daytime TV programming since the earliest days of television. They are generally very inexpensive to produce, making them an economically easy way for a TV station to fill a half-hour (or sometimes 60-minute) time slot. A number of cooking shows have run for many seasons, especially when they are sponsored by local TV stations or by public broadcasting.  Many of the more popular cooking shows have had flamboyant hosts whose unique personalities have made them into celebrities.

Production

Due to time and production constraints, most, if not all, cooking shows employ filming shortcuts such as video editing, food modeling and photography, and prepared ingredients to speed up the cooking process and ensure a smooth and seamless production.

Genres

Many cooking shows are oriented towards instructional material. Some additionally focus on showcasing the personal lives of the host, while some, such as the Rachael Ray Show, blend the genre with a talk show format. There are also reality competitions within the genre such as Iron Chef, MasterChef, Top Chef and others, where contestants are instructed to prepare meals within specific requirements under a time limit for evaluation by a panel of judges, which can include celebrity chefs and other notable personalities. Chopped and Diners, Drive-Ins and Dives are reality cooking shows, and Chefs A' Field and Salt, Fat, Acid, Heat are documentary cooking shows.

History

Until the 1940s, most cooking shows were performed on the radio. The first radio cooking show in the United States, The Betty Crocker Cooking School of the Air, debuted in 1924 and featured the fictional character Betty Crocker.

United Kingdom
One of the first television cooking shows, Cook's Night Out, aired on the BBC on 21 January 1937. Marcel Boulestin, who became famous in the English-speaking world for his cookery books on French cuisine, demonstrated the preparation of an omelet as part of the 15-minute program. Cookery, which was hosted by Philip Harben and aired from 1946–1951, is considered by Guinness World Records to be the first cooking show on television. On the show's debut, Harben demonstrated the preparation of lobster vols-au-vents.

United States
In 1940, Sunday Evening Supper was produced by Edward Padula for the NBC station W2XBS. I Love to Eat was a live television series hosted by James Beard that aired on NBC from 1946–1947. In 1963, The French Chef, one of the first cooking shows in the United States, was launched, and it was hosted by Julia Child, co-author of the cookbook Mastering the Art of French Cooking. In 1973, the cooking show Frugal Gourmet was launched on KTPS-TV, and was hosted by Jeff Smith, a chef from Seattle. In 1993, Food Network launched as a cable channel devoted primarily to cooking shows and other programming relating to food.

Australia
The Chef Presents, one of the first cooking shows in Australia, ran from 1957–1959 and was hosted by Willi Koeppen. The Jean Bowring Show, a cooking show aimed at women, aired from 1957–1960.

Brazil
The first cooking show on Brazilian television, Veja como se cozinha (English: "Watch How It's Cooked"), first aired from 1951–1958 with Marialice Prestes as its host, and then again from 1961–1963 featuring host Ofélia Anunciato. Helena Sangirardi hosted Sirva-se de bons pratos (English: "Help Yourself to Good Dishes") in 1956 and A Alegria de Cozinhar (English: "The Joy of Cooking") in 1957. Cozinha Maravilhosa da Ofélia (English: "Ofélia's Wonderful Cuisine") was hosted by Ofélia Anunciato and aired from 1968–1998, becoming the longest-running Brazilian cooking show.

France
In 1953, Jean d'Arcy, a French television director, was inspired by a cooking show in West Germany and brought the idea to France, resulting in the debut of the show Les Recettes de M. X (English: "The Recipes of Mr. X"). Hosted by comedian Georges Adet, it was the first cooking show to air in France, starting in 1953 and ending a year later. Art et magie de la cuisine (English: "Art and Magic of the Kitchen"), hosted by chef Raymond Oliver, was another one of the first cooking shows to air in France, running from 1954–1967.

Germany
On 20 February 1953, Clemens Wilmenrod bittet zu Tisch (English: "Dinner Is Served"), the first cooking show in then-West Germany, was broadcast, with television chef Clemens Wilmenrod presenting recipes for foods such as Rumtopf and Toast Hawaii.

Japan
In 1953, one of the first cooking shows in Japan, was broadcast, with Hatsuko Kuroda presenting chicken salad.

New Zealand
Graham Kerr was one of the first celebrity chefs to appear on New Zealand television, when the medium was introduced to the country in 1960. Kerr was later followed by Alison Holst, Des Britten, and Hudson and Halls.

Popular culture
Sue Ann Nivens, a character played by Betty White in The Mary Tyler Moore Show, is the host of WJM's The Happy Homemaker, a fictional cooking show. In the Family Guy episode "Pilling Them Softly", Quagmire starts his own cooking show called "Quagmire's Kitchen".

See also
 List of cooking shows
 Food reality television

References

Further reading
 
 
 

 
Television genres